Alice Vaughan, Countess of Carbery (1619-1689), known before her marriage as Alice Egerton, was the daughter of John Egerton, 1st Earl of Bridgewater. She was a musician and performer who acted in two notable masques: Aurelian Townshend's Tempe Restored (1632), and John Milton's Maske Performed at Ludlow Castle (1634).

Alice Egerton was the youngest of eleven daughters. She starred in the singing role of The Lady in Milton's Maske when it was performed at Ludlow Castle in 1634, in honor of her father's appointment as Lord President of Wales. Her younger brothers, John and Thomas, appeared as The Lady's Brothers. Henry Lawes, who wrote the music for the Maske, was Alice Egerton's music teacher. She was participating in a family tradition: her grandmother, Alice Spencer, Countess of Derby, a well-known patron of the arts, had herself appeared in Ben Jonson's The Masque of Queens in 1609 and was the honoree of Milton's masque Arcades. 

Alice Egerton married Richard Vaughan, 2nd Earl of Carbery in 1652, when she was aged about 33 and he was approximately twenty years older; they had no children. The earl succeeded Alice's father as Lord President of Wales following the Restoration of the monarchy in 1660, but he was later removed from the post.

References

1619 births
1689 deaths
English actresses
Carbery
Daughters of British earls